The Ange, less often called the Lange, is a river in the Ain department, eastern France. It is a  left tributary of the Oignin. It flows into the Rhône by the river Ain.

References

Rivers of Ain
Rivers of France
Rivers of Auvergne-Rhône-Alpes